The scaleless killifish or Hazar toothcarp (Aphanius asquamatus) is a species of freshwater fish in the family Cyprinodontidae. It is endemic to Lake Hazar in Turkey. It is a pelagic species that comes to shore in spring–early summer to spawn. It is threatened by the falling water levels of Lake Hazar due to water abstraction and reduced rainfall due to climate change.

References

asquamatus
Endemic fauna of Turkey
Taxonomy articles created by Polbot
Fish described in 1842